Mikhail Kutuzov is a light cruiser project no. 68-bis (designated the  by NATO) of the Soviet and later the Russian Navy's Black Sea Fleet.

Development and design 

The Sverdlov-class cruisers, Soviet designation Project 68bis, were the last conventional gun cruisers built for the Soviet Navy. They were built in the 1950s and were based on Soviet, German, and Italian designs and concepts developed prior to the Second World War. They were modified to improve their sea keeping capabilities, allowing them to run at high speed in the rough waters of the North Atlantic. The basic hull was more modern and had better armor protection than the vast majority of the post Second World War gun cruiser designs built and deployed by peer nations. They also carried an extensive suite of modern radar equipment and anti-aircraft artillery. The Soviets originally planned to build 40 ships in the class, which would be supported by the s and aircraft carriers.

The Sverdlov class displaced 13,600 tons standard and 16,640 tons at full load. The hull was a completely welded new design and the ships had a double bottom for over 75% of their length. The ship also had twenty-three watertight bulkheads. The Sverdlovs had six boilers providing steam to two shaft geared steam turbines generating .

Sverdlov-class cruisers main armament included twelve /57 cal B-38 guns mounted in four triple Mk5-bis turrets. They also had twelve /56 cal Model 1934 guns in six twin SM-5-1 mounts. For anti-aircraft weaponry, the cruisers had thirty-two  anti-aircraft guns in sixteen twin mounts and were also equipped with ten  torpedo tubes in two mountings of five each. In 1986, Mikhail Kutuzov was the fourth and last of the Sverdlov-class to be modernized to the Project 68A standard, replacing the torpedo tubes and four of the 37 mm twin mounts with eight  AK-230 CIWS mounts.

The Sverdlovs had  belt armor and had a  armored deck. The turrets were shielded by  armor and the conning tower, by  armor.

The cruisers' ultimate radar suite included one 'Big Net' or 'Top Trough' air search radar, one 'High Sieve' or 'Low Sieve' air search radar, one 'Knife Rest' air search radar and one 'Slim Net' air search radar. For navigational radar they had one 'Don-2' or 'Neptune' model. For fire control purposes the ships were equipped with two 'Sun Visor' radars, two 'Top Bow' 152 mm gun radars and eight 'Egg Cup' gun radars. For electronic countermeasures the ships were equipped with two 'Watch Dog' ECM systems.

Construction and career 
She was laid down at the Black Sea Shipyard in Nikolayev on 23 February 1951 and commissioned on 30 December 1954. Mikhail Kutuzov joined the Black Sea Fleet after commissioning and sea trials, on 31 January 1955.

On 28 July 2002, Mikhail Kutuzov was opened to the public as a museum ship in Novorossiysk. On 1 October 2012, she was made a branch of the Central Naval Museum.

Pennant numbers

References

External links

1952 ships
Sverdlov-class cruisers
Ships built in the Soviet Union
Museum ships in Russia
Ships built at the Black Sea Shipyard
Cold War cruisers of the Soviet Union